Mark Andrew Bartosic (born June 21, 1961) is an American prelate of the Catholic Church who has been an auxiliary bishop for the Archdiocese of Chicago in Illinois since 2018.

Biography

Early life 
Mark  Bartosic was born in Neenah, Wisconsin on June 21, 1961.  He attended St. Edward School in Ashland, Ohio, then completed his secondary education in the Ashland City School District. Bartosic attended Ashland University, obtaining a Bachelor of Arts degree in theater.

After graduating from college in 1983, Bartosic moved to Chicago to get acting jobs.  According to Bartosic, he started attending mass at a Chicago church and was impressed with how much more diverse it was than his church in Ashland. After re-evaluating his chances of becoming a successful actor, he decided he would rather be a successful priest.  In 1989, Bartosic entered the University of St. Mary of the Lake in Mundelein, Illinois and later Niles College Seminary at Loyola University Chicago.  After graduation, Bartosic spent a year in Mexico working in an orphanage.

Priesthood 
On May 21, 1994, Bartosic was ordained to the priesthood for the Archdiocese of Chicago at Holy Name Cathedral in Chicago by Cardinal Joseph Bernardin.

After his ordination, Bartosic was assigned as associate pastor to St. Agnes of Bohemia Parish in Chicago.  In 2001, he was named pastor of St. Frances of Rome Parish in Cicero, Illinois, serving there for 15 years.  Bartosic assumed the additional pastoral duties at Our Lady of Charity Parish in Cicero in 2009. In 2016, Bartosic was named Director of the Kolbe House Jail Ministry in Chicago as well as the pastor of Assumption Blessed Virgin Mary Parish in Chicago.

Auxiliary Bishop of Chicago
Pope Francis appointed Bartosic as auxiliary bishop for the Archdiocese of Chicago on July 3, 2018. He was consecrated at Holy Name Cathedral on September 17, 2018 by Cardinal Blase Cupich.

On September 22, 2018, Cupich suspended Paul Kalchik, the pastor of Resurrection Parish in Chicago, after receiving complaints from parishioners.  Ten days earlier, Kalchik had held an exorcism at the church, followed by the burning of a rainbow flag on the church grounds.  Bartosic met with Kalchik at the parish and told him he had to leave his residence or be arrested for trespassing.  Since Kalchik was just getting ready to officiate a wedding, Bartosic took his place.

See also

 Catholic Church hierarchy
 Catholic Church in the United States
 Historical list of the Catholic bishops of the United States
 List of Catholic bishops of the United States
 Lists of patriarchs, archbishops, and bishops

References

External links
Roman Catholic Archdiocese of Chicago Official Site

Episcopal succession

 

1961 births
Living people
People from Neenah, Wisconsin
Catholics from Wisconsin
21st-century Roman Catholic bishops in the United States
Bishops appointed by Pope Francis